Desert Gold may refer to:
 Geraea canescens, a wildflower also known as Desert Sunflower
 Desert Gold (horse), a New Zealand Thoroughbred racehorse
Desert Gold (1919 film), an Australian film about the racehorse and directed by Beaumont Smith
 Desert Gold (novel), a novel set in the Old West by Zane Grey
Desert Gold (1919 American film), a 1919 American film based on the novel and directed by T. Hayes Hunter
 Desert Gold (1926 film), a 1926 American film based on the novel and directed by George B. Seitz
 Desert Gold (1936 film), a 1936 American film based on the novel and directed by James P. Hogan